Christopher David Glennon (29 October 1949 – 10 May 2016) was an English footballer who played as a forward in the Football League for Manchester City and Tranmere Rovers.

References

1949 births
2016 deaths
Footballers from Manchester
English footballers
Association football forwards
Manchester City F.C. players
Tranmere Rovers F.C. players
Northwich Victoria F.C. players
English Football League players